Headroom Studios is a music recording studio in Philadelphia, Pennsylvania. It was originally started by Kyle Pulley and Joe Reinhart in 2008 in a room in a live/work artist warehouse collective, located in North Philadelphia, until it moved to its current location in a commercial building in the North Philadelphia neighborhood of Kensington.

Pulley and Reinhart were college classmates who were active in the Philadelphia DIY punk scene who decided to partner after graduation in order create the studio to start their careers in music. In addition to being producers, Pulley and Reinhart are active musicians playing in Thin Lips (Pulley) and Hop Along (Reinhart).

Artists such as Modern Baseball, Hop Along, Algernon Cadwallader, Remo Drive, Adult Mom, Shamir, The Districts, Alex G, Frances Quinlan, Prince Daddy & The Hyena, Beach Bunny, Joyce Manor, Diet Cig, Kississippi, Thin Lips, Bad Moves, Mal Blum, Field Mouse, The World is a Beautiful Place and I Am No Longer Afraid to Die, Mt. Joy, Vundabar, Timeshares, Snowing, and Katie Ellen, have recorded, mixed or otherwise worked on songs or albums at Headroom Studios and/or with Pulley/Reinhart.

References 

Recording studios in the United States
Companies based in Philadelphia
2008 establishments in Pennsylvania